Maale is one of the woredas in the Southern Nations, Nationalities, and Peoples' Region of Ethiopia. It is named after the Maale people who are living at this woreda. Part of the Debub Omo Zone, Male is bordered on the south by Bena Tsemay, on the west by Bako Gazer, on the north by the Basketo special woreda and Gelila, on the north and east by the Gamo Gofa Zone, and on the southeast by Dirashe special woreda. Male was separated from Bako Gazer woreda.

Demographics 
Based on the 2007 Census conducted by the CSA, this woreda has a total population of 84,693, of whom 42,871 are men and 41,822 women; 914 or 1.08% of its population are urban dwellers. The majority of the inhabitants practiced traditional beliefs, with 68.84% of the population reporting that belief, 19.01% were Protestants, and 3.89% practiced Ethiopian Orthodox Christianity.

Notes 

Districts of the Southern Nations, Nationalities, and Peoples' Region